Free-running sleep is a rare sleep pattern whereby the sleep schedule of a person shifts later every day. It occurs as the sleep disorder non-24-hour sleep–wake disorder or artificially as part of experiments used in the study of circadian and other rhythms in biology. Study subjects are shielded from all time cues, often by a constant light protocol, by a constant dark protocol or by the use of light/dark conditions to which the organism cannot entrain such as the ultrashort protocol of one hour dark and two hours light. Also, limited amounts of food may be made available at short intervals so as to avoid entrainment to mealtimes. Subjects are thus forced to live by their internal circadian "clocks".

Background
The individual's or animal's circadian phase can be known only by the monitoring of some kind of output of the circadian system, the internal "body clock". The researcher can precisely determine, for example, the daily cycles of gene activity, body temperature, blood pressure, hormone secretion and/or sleep and activity/alertness. Alertness in humans can be determined by many kinds of verbal and non-verbal tests, whereas alertness in animals can usually be assessed by observing physical activity (for example, of wheel-running in rodents).

When animals or people free-run, experiments can be done to see what sort of signals, known as zeitgebers, are effective in entrainment. Also, much work has been done to see how long or short a circadian cycle can be entrained to various organisms. For example, some animals can be entrained to a 22-hour day, but they can not be entrained to a 20-hour day. In recent studies funded by the U.S. space industry, it has been shown that most humans can be entrained to a 23.5-hour day and to a 24.65-hour day.

The effect of unintended time cues is called masking and can totally confound experimental results. Examples of masking are morning rush traffic audible to the subjects, or researchers or maintenance staff visiting subjects on a regular schedule.

In humans
Non-24-hour sleep–wake disorder, also referred to as free-running disorder (FRD) or Non-24, is one of the circadian rhythm sleep disorders in humans. It affects more than half of people who are totally blind and a smaller number of sighted individuals.

Among blind people, the cause is the inability to register, and therefore to entrain to, light cues. The many blind people who do entrain to the 24-hour light/dark cycle have eyes with functioning retinas including operative non-visual light-sensitive cells, ipRGCs. These ganglion cells, which contain melanopsin, convey their signals to the "circadian clock" via the retinohypothalamic tract (branching off from the optic nerve), linking the retina to the pineal gland.

Among sighted individuals, Non-24 usually first appears in the teens or early twenties. As with delayed sleep phase disorder (DSPS or DSPD), in the absence of neurological damage due to trauma or stroke, cases almost never appear after the age of 30. Non-24 affects more sighted males than sighted females. A quarter of sighted individuals with Non-24 also have an associated psychiatric condition, and a quarter of them have previously shown symptoms of DSPS.

See also
 Circadian rhythm
 Circadian rhythm sleep disorder

References

External links
 A collection of articles about sleep by Piotr A. Wozniak, July 2000

Sleep
Circadian rhythm